McPherson Square is a Washington Metro station in Downtown, Washington, D.C., United States. The side-platformed station is operated by the Washington Metropolitan Area Transit Authority (WMATA). Providing service for the Blue, Silver, and Orange Lines, the station is located between McPherson Square and Franklin Square, with two entrances on I Street at Vermont Avenue and 14th Street NW. This is the main station to access the White House, and the Vermont Avenue exit is directly underneath the Department of Veterans Affairs building.

History
The station opened on July 1, 1977. Orange Line service to the station began upon the line's opening on November 20, 1978.

Between January 15 to January 21, 2021, this station was closed because of security concerns due to the 2020 Inauguration.

Station layout

Notable places nearby 
 Blair House
 Department of the Treasury
 Center for American Progress
 American Constitution Society
 Hudson Institute
 Lafayette Square
 St. John's Episcopal Church
 Strayer University
 The Washington Post Headquarters
 The White House

References

External links
 

 McPherson Square (Washington Metro) is at coordinates:
  Vermont Avenue Entrance
  14th Street Entrance
 Vermont Avenue entrance from Google Maps Street View
 14th Street entrance from Google Maps Street View

Stations on the Blue Line (Washington Metro)
Downtown (Washington, D.C.)
Stations on the Orange Line (Washington Metro)
Stations on the Silver Line (Washington Metro)
Washington Metro stations in Washington, D.C.
Railway stations in the United States opened in 1977
1977 establishments in Washington, D.C.
Railway stations located underground in Washington, D.C.